Lucas Pouille was the defending champion but lost in the first round to Martín Cuevas.

Alexei Popyrin won the title after defeating Quentin Halys 2–6, 7–6(7–5), 7–6(7–4) in the final.

Seeds

Draw

Finals

Top half

Bottom half

References

External links
Main draw
Qualifying draw

BNP Paribas Primrose Bordeaux - 1
2022 Singles